Atone is the second studio album by the progressive pop group White Moth Black Butterfly, made up of Daniel Tompkins of TesseracT, Keshav Dhar of Skyharbor, Randy Slaugh, Jordan Bethany and Mac Christensen.  It was released through Kscope Records on 1 September 2017.  The album was recorded in several locations in the UK, India, the US, and Taiwan.

Track listing

Personnel

White Moth Black Butterfly 
 Daniel Tompkins – lead vocals
 Keshav Dhar – guitar, programming
 Randy Slaugh – keyboard, orchestration, programming
 Jordan Bethany – lead vocals
 Mac Christensen – drums, percussion

References 

2017 albums
Kscope albums
White Moth Black Butterfly albums